The Falls Church News-Press is a weekly newspaper in Falls Church, Virginia.  The periodical was founded in 1991 by Owner/Editor-in-Chief Nicholas F. Benton.

The News-Press claims a free circulation of 10,000. It is delivered in Bailey's Crossroads, Sleepy Hollow, Pimmit Hills, Lake Barcroft, and City of Falls Church regions.

The newspaper was named CityPaper's "Best Remnant of the Liberal Media" for 2008.

Along with its weekly coverage of local affairs over 30 years, the paper keeps up with the effect local news has on matters with national importance, though not always with widespread approval.

For example, when the namesake Falls Church was the subject of a contentious split in the Episcopalian/Anglican denomination, the News-Press reported the details.

When White House reporter Helen Thomas retired from Hearst Newspapers amid controversy, she became a columnist for the News-Press.

A hometown author, writing about the importance of commitment to his the local community, says "... [Nick] Benton drove into Falls Church one day in 1991 and said, “this town needs a newspaper,” and day after day for 30 years, he has produced that newspaper every week."

References

External links
 

Newspapers published in Virginia
Weekly newspapers published in the United States
Falls Church, Virginia